Þröstur Leó Gunnarsson (English transliteration: Thröstur Leó Gunnarsson; born 23 April 1961 in Reykjavík), is an Icelandic stage, film and television actor.

Early life
Þröstur Leó Gunnarsson graduated from the Icelandic School of Drama in 1985. He then began his career onstage at the Leikfélag Reykjavíkur, Reykjavik's premier theatre company, where he appeared in productions as: John Steinbeck's' The Grapes of Wrath, William Shakespeare's Hamlet, Molière's Tartuffe, Anton Chekhov's Platonov and Birgir Sigurðsson's .

Stage and film career
Þröstur's first film role came in the 1986 Hilmar Oddsson-directed drama Eins og skepnan deyr (English release title: The Beast). He then followed in a number of films and television movies. He is possibly best recalled internationally for his roles in Baltasar Kormákur's 2000 romantic comedy 101 Reykjavík, opposite Spanish actress Victoria Abril, Kormákur's 2002 drama Hafið (English release title: The Sea), 2002's United States/Icelandic coproduction of No Such Thing, a bilingual fantasy starring Sarah Polley, Helen Mirren and Julie Christie, and Dagur Kári's 2003 drama Nói albínói (Nói the Albino). For his role in Nói albínói, Þröstur won Best Supporting Actor at the 5th Edda Awards.

In 2008, Þröstur won Iceland's Edda Award for Best Supporting Actor for his role in the Baltasar Kormákur directed drama Brúðguminn.

In May 2009, Þröstur began directing the play Við Borgum, Við Ekki! Borgum Ekki! (English title: We Can't Pay! Won't Pay!), a comedy centering on the 2008–2012 Icelandic financial crisis at the Borgarleikhúsið Reykjavik City Theatre.

In November 2009, he was the beneficiary of the Mrs. Stefania Guðmundsdóttir Memorial Fund (Icelandic: Minningarsjóður frú Stefaníu Guðmundsdóttur), a fund established in 1938 to promote Icelandic drama and theatre.

Personal life
On 7 July 2015, a fishing vessel he was working on, Jón Hákon BA 60, capsized and sank close to Aðalvík. Þröstur and two of the crew where rescued a hour later while another crewmember died in the accident.

Filmography
1986 Eins og skepnan deyr (English release title: The Beast)
1987 Áramótaskaup 1987 (Icelandic television movie)
1989 Flugþrá (Icelandic television short) – Boy
1989 Magnús – Gísli
1992 Sódóma Reykjavík (English release title: Remote Control) – Áslákur
1993 Í ljósaskiptunum (Icelandic video)
1995 Tár úr steini (English: Tears of Stone) – Jón
1996 Áramótaskaup 1996 (Icelandic television movie)
1997 Perlur og svín – Erlingur
1997 Stikkfrí (English release title: Count Me Out) – Siggi
1998 Áramótaskaup 1998 (Icelandic television movie)
1999  Skaupið: 1999 (Icelandic television movie)
2000 101 Reykjavík – Brúsi
2000 Óskabörn þjóðarinnar (English release title: Plan B)
2001 No Such Thing – First mate
2002 Hafið (English release title: The Sea) – Kalli Bumba
2003 Nói albínói (English release title: Noi the Albino) – Kiddi Beikon
2003 Þriðja nafni (English release title: The Third Name) – Arnar
2003 Njálssaga (Icelandic television movie) – Melkólfur
2004 Áramótaskaup 2004 (Icelandic television movie) – various roles
2005 Carjackin (short film) – Manager
2005 Beowulf & Grendel – Guard
2006 Köld slóð (English: Cold Trail) – Baldur Maríusson
2007 Parents – Addi
2008 Support (short film) – Suicidal patient
2008 Brúðguminn (English release title: White Night Wedding) – Börkur
2008 Sveitabrúðkaup (English release title: Country Wedding) – Svanur
2008 Reykjavik-Rotterdam – Jensen
2009 Reyndu aftur (short film) – Axel
2009 The Cliff (Icelandic television series) – Freyr
2010 Kóngavegur (English: King's Road) – Kári
2010 Algjör Sveppi og dularfulla hótelherbergið – Jón Gamli
2011 Eldfjall (English release title: Volcano) – Janitor
2012 Svartur á leik (English release title: Black's Game) – Jói Faró 
2012 Djúpið (English release title: The Deep) – Lárus
2013 Metalhead – Gunnar
2014 Hjonabandssaela (short film) – Fannar  
2014 Harry Og Heimir – Sigtryggur Klein
2015 Klukkur um jól (Icelandic television series) – Dad
2016 Pale Star – Ari
2016 Eiðurinn (English release title: The Oath) – Eldri Maður
2017 Ég man þig (English release title: I Remember You) – Skipstjóri
2017–2018 Hversdagsreglur (Icelandic television series)
2018 Flateyjargátan (Icelandic television miniseries) – Sailor
2020 Síðasta veiðiferðin (English release title: The Last Fishing Trip) – Hansi
2021 Alma
2021 Heartless (short film) – Pétur
2021 Áramótaskaup (Icelandic television series)
2022 Verbúðin (Icelandic television series) – Tryggvi
2022 Allra síðasta veiðiferðin – Hansi 
2022 Vitjanir (Icelandic television series) – Guðjón Leó
2022 Svar við bréfi Helgu (English release title: A Letter from Helga) – Jósteinn
2022 Á Ferð með Mömmu (English release title: Driving Mum) – Jón
2023 Operation Napoleon – Jóhannes

References

External links

1961 births
Icelandic male film actors
Male actors from Reykjavík
Living people
Icelandic male television actors
Icelandic male stage actors
20th-century Icelandic male actors
21st-century Icelandic male actors